"Shivers" is a song by English singer-songwriter Ed Sheeran, released through Asylum Records and Atlantic Records on 10 September 2021 as the second single from his fifth studio album, = (2021). "Shivers" entered atop the charts in the United Kingdom and Ireland, dethroning Sheeran's previous single "Bad Habits" after eleven consecutive weeks at the summit in both countries. The song also topped the charts in Austria, Germany, Sweden and Switzerland and peaked at number four on the Billboard Hot 100.

Background
Sheeran referred to the song while explaining why the album title was = instead of –, as fans had predicted, in which he said: "I was making the record and I wrote a song called 'Shivers' and I was like, 'This doesn't really feel like [Minus]". Sheeran wrote "Shivers" at the end of the Divide tour, when he set up a studio at a rented farm in Suffolk where he had his last date of the tour. It took him three days to write the song, which was unusually long for him, as he felt the song "was too special to get wrong".

Release and promotion
On 19 August 2021, Sheeran announced his fourth studio album, =, in which the song is listed on the tracklist. He later announced the cover art and release date of the song on 2 September 2021. He also revealed that "Shivers" was originally intended to be the lead single for the album instead of its current lead single, "Bad Habits". A preview of the song was also listed. Sheeran announced its accompanying music video and a teaser video of it on Labour Day, 6 September 2021.

Critical reception
On 2 September 2021, the same day Sheeran announced the song, Jonathan Heaf from the United Kingdom branch of GQ in Sheeran's hometown, described the song as "a sexy, rocketing song that includes hand claps in the bridge and is music to dance to with your best friends after three too many tequilas".

Music video
A music video was released along with the song on 10 September 2021, starring Sheeran and AnnaSophia Robb. It has over 234 millions views as of October 2022. Just like his previous video "Bad Habits", it was directed by Dave Meyers. In the music video, Sheeran meets Robb at a diner and starts going through wild fantasies with her, including getting revived in a morgue after a text from her that he was waiting for finally arrives, dancing together in a bird-filled hotel, and fighting off some goons (with Sheeran suddenly wearing knight armor in the midst of the fight). In some scenes in the music video, Sheeran emulates fellow English singer Elton John in scenes where he wears sequins and feathers.

Track listing

Digital download, streaming and CD single
"Shivers" – 3:27

Digital download and streaming – Acoustic Version
"Shivers" (Acoustic Version) – 3:26

Digital download and streaming – Navos Remix
"Shivers" (Navos Remix) – 2:35

Digital download and streaming – Ofenbach Remix
"Shivers" (Ofenbach Remix) – 3:07

Digital download and streaming – Alok Remix
"Shivers" (Alok Remix) – 2:52

Digital download and streaming – Jax Jones Remix
"Shivers" (Jax Jones Remix) – 3:27

Digital download and streaming – Heavy-K Remix
"Shivers" (Heavy-K Remix) – 5:40

Digital download and streaming – Dillon Francis Remixes
"Shivers" (Dillon Francis Main Mix) – 2:07
"Shivers" (Dillon Francis Club Mix) – 2:07

Digital download and streaming – featuring Jessi and SUNMI
"Shivers" (featuring Jessi and SUNMI) – 3:27

Digital download and streaming – featuring Feduk and Slava Marlow
"Shivers" (featuring Feduk and Slava Marlow) – 2:46

Credits and personnel
Credits adapted from Spotify and Tidal.
 Ed Sheeran – vocals, songwriting, production, guitar, pizzicato violin
 Johnny McDaid – songwriting, unknown vocals, guitar
 Kal Lavelle – songwriting
 Steve Mac – songwriting, production, keyboard, vocal production
 Fred – production, bass, drums, guitar, keyboard, programming
 Charlie Holmes – assistant mixing
 Chris Laws – drums, programming, unknown vocals, recording
 Dan Pursey – vocal production, unknown vocals, recording
 Graham Archer – unknown vocals, vocal production
 Joe Rubel – unknown vocals, recording, additional programming
 Kieran Beardmore – assistant mixing
 Mark “Spike” Stent – mixing
 Matt Wolach – assistant mixing
 Stuart Hawkes – mastering

Charts

Weekly charts

Year-end charts

Certifications

Release history

References

External links
 

2021 singles
2021 songs
Asylum Records singles
Atlantic Records singles
British dance-pop songs
Ed Sheeran songs
Irish Singles Chart number-one singles
Number-one singles in Austria
Number-one singles in Germany
Number-one singles in Sweden
Number-one singles in Switzerland
Song recordings produced by Ed Sheeran
Song recordings produced by Fred Again
Song recordings produced by Steve Mac
Songs written by Ed Sheeran
Songs written by Johnny McDaid
Songs written by Kal Lavelle
Songs written by Steve Mac
UK Singles Chart number-one singles
Music videos directed by Dave Meyers (director)